Rex Motion Picture Company was an early film production company in the United States.

History
After Edwin S. Porter's short-lived Defender Film Company failed, The Rex Motion Picture Company was established by Edwin S. Porter, Joseph Engel, and William Swanson. Rex, based at 573–579 11th Avenue, New York City. produced dozens of films from 1910 into 1917. It adopted a crown emblem.

Lois Weber established herself in the film industry at Rex.

Rex acquired Gem Motion Picture Company film properties and released them in 1912 under its own banner and later Universal's. Rex was one of the studios that combined to form Universal Pictures under Carl Laemmle's leadership.

Filmography
 By the Light of the Moon (film) (1911)
 Leaves in the Storm (1912), extant
 The Fine Feathers (1912), extant
 A Japanese Idyll (1912), extant
 The Honor of the Family (1912), lost
 Suspense (1913 film), extant
 Symphony of Souls (1914)
 The Heart of the Hills (1914)
 Alas and Alack (1915), partial print is extant
 All for Peggy (1915), lost
 The Stronger Mind (1915), lost
 Cross Purposes (film) (1916)
 Unmasked (1917 film)''

References

Mass media companies established in 1910
Mass media companies disestablished in 1917
Defunct American film studios
Film production companies of the United States
Silent film studios